Senator Pico may refer to:

Andrés Pico (1810–1876), California State Senate
José Garriga Picó (born 1948), Senate of Puerto Rico